Lygodesmia juncea, the rush skeletonplant or just skeletonweed, is a species of flowering plant in the family Asteraceae, native to the western and central United States and western Canada. Widespread and considered somewhat weedy, it is adapted to blowing or otherwise disturbed soils, but not to fire. It is a perennial herb. Petals are pink or violet in color and flowers bloom June to September.

References

juncea
Flora of Western Canada
Flora of the Northwestern United States
Flora of the North-Central United States
Flora of Nevada
Flora of Utah
Flora of Arizona
Flora of the South-Central United States
Flora of Arkansas
Flora of Indiana
Plants described in 1834
Flora without expected TNC conservation status